The Santebal (meaning "keeper of peace") was the secret police of the Khmer Rouge's Democratic Kampuchea (DK) regime in Cambodia.

The Santebal was in charge of internal security and running prison camps like Tuol Sleng (S-21) where thousands of people were imprisoned, interrogated, tortured and executed. It was part of the Khmer Rouge organizational structure well before the Fall of Phnom Penh on 17 April 1975. Its name is an amalgam of two words: sântĕsŏkh meaning "security" and nôkôrbal meaning "police".

History
As early as 1971, the Khmer Rouge or the Communist Party of Kampuchea established the Special Zone outside of Phnom Penh under the direction of Vorn Vet and Son Sen. Sen, later the Deputy Minister for Defense of Democratic Kampuchea, was also in charge of the Santebal, and in that capacity he appointed Comrade Duch to run its security apparatus. Most of the Santebal's deputies, such as Comrade Chan and Comrade Pon (Chan's deputy), hailed from Kampong Thom, Duch's home province.

When the Khmer Rouge took power in 1975, Duch moved his headquarters to Phnom Penh and reported directly to Sen. At that time, a small chapel in the capital was used to incarcerate the regime's prisoners, who totaled fewer than two hundred. In May 1976, Duch moved his headquarters to its final location, a former high school known as Tuol Sleng, which could hold up to 1,500 prisoners. It was at Tuol Sleng that the major purges of the Khmer Rouge cadres took place and thousands of prisoners were tortured and killed. Between 1976 and 1978, 20,000 Cambodians were imprisoned at Tuol Sleng. Of this number only seven adults are known to have survived. However, Tuol Sleng was only one of at least 150 execution centres in the country.

References
 

Khmer Rouge
Law enforcement in communist states
National security institutions
Secret police